Émil Herman Grubbé (1 January 1875 — 26 March 1960) was possibly the first American to use x-rays as a treatment for cancer (versus detection) but this is disputed and no reliable contemporary source of this claim exists.  He was born in Chicago, and received his medical training at a homeopathic institute: the Hahnemann Medical College of Chicago.  It was there that Grubbe assembled the first x-ray machine in Chicago in 1896, and that same year, used it to treat a woman with recurrent carcinoma of the breast (disputed).  He assembled the machine and began to use it in treatments less than a year after Wilhelm Röntgen announced his discovery of the x-ray.  By 1960, Grubbe had instructed over 7000 other doctors in the medical use of x-rays.  In the course of his lifetime, he underwent more than 90 operations for multiple cancers caused by his intense, ongoing exposure to radiation, a disease from which he died. Honors were bestowed upon Grubbe by numerous institutions, including the American Cancer Society.  He was also a fellow of the American College of Physicians.  Grubbe left money in his will to the Chicago Radiological Society to fund the Grubbe Memorial Award.

See also
History of radiation therapy

References

Further reading
 
 
 
 

People from Chicago
American radiologists
American medical researchers
1875 births
1960 deaths